David Rothenberg may refer to:

 David Rothenberg, American professor of philosophy and music
 David Rothenberg (activist), American theatrical producer and prisoners' rights activist
 Dave Dave, American artist and burn victim, born David Rothenberg